Ian Little may refer to:
 Ian Little (economist) (1918–2012), British economist
 Ian Little (footballer) (born 1973), Scottish footballer
 Ian Little (producer) (born 1954), British record producer on Duran Duran albums such as Seven and the Ragged Tiger